Kay Kay and His Weathered Underground is the debut, self-titled album from Seattle musical collective Kay Kay and His Weathered Underground.

After a copy of the band's cassette found its way to John Sidel of V2 Records, the band signed an initial agreement to record a full-length album, but V2 was bought out by Universal Music shortly thereafter and a finalized contract never materialized.

The band eventually struck a deal with Vinyl Collective, a subsidiary of Suburban Home Records, to put out a double-LP vinyl version of the album.  It was made available on the Vinyl Collective website in March 2008 after the band quietly released it on Amazon.com's MP3 download store.  The album has since been made available for download on iTunes.

The album was released on compact disc on May 26, 2009 via Suburban Home.

Track listing 
All songs and lyrics written by Kirk Huffman and Kyle O'Quin.  Orchestral arrangements by Phillip A. Peterson.
 Into The Realm Of The Unknown (0:59)
 Hey Momma' (4:11)
 Birds (On A Day Like Today) (3:54)
 Simon Courage Flees The Coop (3:26)
 Ol' Rum Davies (2:27)
 Bowie The Desert Pea (5:03)
 Santa Cruz Lined Pockets (3:43)
 Bloodstone Goddess (5:38)
 Cloud Country (3:44)
 Swan Ink (5:04)
 Night Of The Star Child's Funk (5:03)
 One Ought To See (2:50)
 All Alone (6:38)
 Sword and Sorcery (Vinyl-only bonus track)

Vinyl information
The album's first pressing had three different variations on vinyl, totaling 1,000 copies in the first run:
 Transparent rainbow - 200 copies (no longer available)
 Milky rainbow - 300 copies
 Orange with red speckles - 500 copies

The second pressing was pressed on standard blue.

Album personnel

Kay Kay 
 Kirk Huffman - lead vocals, guitar
 Kyle O'Quin - keys, backing vocals
 Phillip A. Peterson - cello, backing vocals, falsetto vocals

His Weathered Underground 
 Victoria Parker - violin, backing vocals
 Robert Parker - trumpet
 Chet Peterson
 Flora Peterson
 Robin Marsh
 Jonathan Peterson
 JJ Jang - violin
 Joey Seward - tuba
 Erik Howk
 Nate Mooter - bass, backing vocals
 Jacob Hoffman
 Cameron Parkins
 Thomas Hunter - guitar
 Garrett Lunceford - drums
 Racheal Huffman - backing vocals, percussion
 Carey Rayburn - trumpet
 Jacob Kauffman
 Valdy

Credits 
 Produced by Phillip A. Peterson, Kirk Huffman, and Kyle O'Quin.
 Engineered by Phillip A. Peterson, assisted by Matt Clifford.
 Addition recording by Tom Pfaeffle at The Tank Studio
 Mixed and mastered by Tom Pfaeffle.

References 

Kay Kay and His Weathered Underground albums
2008 albums